Syzygium klampok, the klampok, is a species of flowering plant in the family Myrtaceae, native to Sumatra‎ and Java, Indonesia. Due to its association with springs, it is considered a sacred tree.

References

klampok
Endemic flora of Indonesia
Flora of Sumatra
Flora of Java
Plants described in 1944